Park Seunghyun (born May 28, 1984) is a professional Go player.

Biography
Park was taught by Kwan Kab Ryong. He became a professional in 2000. In 2001, he was promoted to 2 dan, then 4 dan in 2004. He is currently 8 dan. He has participated in the 2002 Samsung Cup and 2007 LG Cup.

External links
GoBase Profile
Sensei's Library Profile
Korea Baduk Association profile (in Korean)

1984 births
Living people
South Korean Go players